The girl's 200 metre butterfly event at the 2010 Youth Olympic Games took place on August 16, at the Singapore Sports School.

Medalists

Heats

Heat 1

Heat 2

Heat 3

Final

References
 Heat Results
 Final Result

Swimming at the 2010 Summer Youth Olympics